Galomecalpa lesta is a species of moth of the family Tortricidae. It is found in Pastaza Province, Ecuador.

The wingspan is about 14 mm. The ground colour of the forewings is brownish cream with brownish strigulation (fine streaks) and brown markings. The hindwings are cream tinged with brownish and strigulated with brownish grey.

Etymology
The species name refers to a forgotten species and is derived from Greek lestis (meaning oblivion).

References

Moths described in 2013
Euliini